Calophyllum tomentosum is a species of flowering plant in the family Calophyllaceae, commonly known as bintangur. It is found in Sri Lanka and the Western Ghats.

References

tomentosum
Flora of Sri Lanka
Vulnerable plants
Taxonomy articles created by Polbot